Results of Rallye Deutschland (26. ADAC Rallye Deutschland), 10th round of 2007 World Rally Championship, run on August 17–19:

Report 
Sébastien Loeb had won the Rallye Deutschland for the sixth time in a row, something no other driver had managed to do before. In the Drivers' World Championship, the defending champion gained five points over the leading Marcus Grönholm, who lost two places on Sunday due to a driving error, when a cow along the route disturbed Grönholm's concentration, damaging the rear of the car very badly and ended up fourth after her teammate Mikko Hirvonen.

François Duval drove a flawless rally and secured second place overall. The privateer was able to win all five special stages on Sunday and worked his way up to second place in the final kilometers of the "Moselwein 2" stage (SS19). In the end, he was only 20.3 seconds short of Loeb.

Surprising information was the end of career by Jakke Honkanen, the Gardemeister pilot, who unexpectedly announced it immediately after the end of the rally, while still at the PKC.

Results

Retirements 
  Michał Kościuszko - mechanical (SS1);
  Erik Wevers - mechanical (SS2);
  Thomas Schie - mechanical (SS4/5);
  Daniel Sordo - engine failure (SS6);
  Patrick Sandell - excluded (after SS6);
  Manfred Stohl - engine failure (SS9);

Special Stages 
All dates and times are CEST (UTC+2).

Championship standings after the event

Drivers' championship

Manufacturers' championship

External links 

 Results on official site - WRC.com
 Results on eWRC-results.com
 Results on RallyBase.nl

Deutschland
2007
Rally